Timokhino is a rural locality (a village) in Semizerye Rural Settlement, Kaduysky District, Vologda Oblast, Russia. The population was 28 as of 2002.

Geography 
Timokhino is located 64 km northwest of Kaduy (the district's administrative centre) by road. Turpal is the nearest rural locality.

References 

Rural localities in Kaduysky District